Cytaea levii is a species of jumping spider.

Appearance
The species is allied to C. alburna.

Name
Cytaea levii is named in honor of H. W. Levi, a mentor of one of the first describers at Harvard University.

Distribution
Cytaea levii is only known from Taiwan.

References

  (2002): Four new and two newly recorded species of Taiwanese jumping spiders (Araneae: Salticidae) deposited in the United States. Zoological Studies 41(3): 337-345. PDF
  (2007): The world spider catalog, version 8.0. American Museum of Natural History.

levii
Spiders described in 2002
Spiders of Taiwan
Endemic fauna of Taiwan